Dynamo FC or Dinamo FC may refer to several association football clubs worldwide.

Africa
 Benin:
Dynamo Abomey F.C.
Ghana:
Ho Dynamo FC
 Seychelles:
Northern Dynamo FC
 South Africa:
Dynamos F.C. (South Africa)
 Zambia:
Power Dynamos F.C.
 Zimbabwe:
Dynamos F.C.

Asia
 India:
Delhi Dynamos FC
 Kyrgyzstan:
Dordoi-Dynamo Naryn
 Tajikistan:
Dynamo Dushanbe
 Uzbekistan:
FK Samarqand-Dinamo

Europe
 Albania:
FK Dinamo Tirana
 Belarus:
 FC Dinamo Minsk
 FC Dynamo Brest
 Bulgaria:
Levski Sofia 
 Croatia:
HNK Cibalia, formerly NK Dinamo Vinkovci
NK Dinamo Zagreb
 Cyprus:
Dynamo Pervolion
 Czech Republic:
SK Dynamo České Budějovice
 England:
 Shepshed Dynamo F.C.
 Loughborough Dynamo F.C.
 Estonia:
Dünamo Tallinn
 Georgia:
FC Dinamo Tbilisi
FC Dinamo Batumi
 Germany:
 Berliner FC Dynamo
 SG Dynamo Dresden
 Hungary
 Újpesti Dózsa
Ireland:
 Tralee Dynamos A.F.C.
 Latvia:
FK Dinamo-Rīnuži/LASD
 Moldova: 
 FC Dinamo-Auto Tiraspol
 FC Dinamo Bender
 Romania:
FC Dinamo București
 Russia:
 FC Dynamo Barnaul
 FC Dynamo Bryansk
 FC Dynamo Kemerovo
 FC Dynamo Kirov
 FC Dynamo Kostroma
 FC Dynamo Makhachkala
 FC Dynamo Moscow
 FC Dynamo Omsk
 FC Dynamo Perm
 FC Dynamo Saint Petersburg
 FC Dynamo Stavropol
 FC Dynamo Tula
 FC Dynamo Vologda
 FC Dynamo Voronezh
 Serbia: 
 FK Dinamo Pančevo
 FK Dinamo Vranje
  Ukraine:

 FC Dynamo Bila Tserkva, now FC Ros' Bila Tserkva
 FC Dynamo Chernihiv, now FC Desna Chernihiv
 FC Dynamo Chortkiv, now FC Krystal Chortkiv 
 FC Dynamo Irpin, now FC Ros' Bila Tserkva
 FC Dynamo Kharkiv
 FC Dynamo Khmelnytskyi
 FC Dynamo Kirovohrad, now FC Zirka Kirovohrad 
 FC Dynamo Kyiv
 FC Dynamo-2 Kyiv
 FC Dynamo-3 Kyiv
 FC Dynamo Luhansk
 FC Dynamo Odessa, now FC Chornomorets Odessa
 FC Dynamo Saky
 FC Dynamo Simferopol, now FC Ihroservice Simferopol
 Wales:
Pentwyn Dynamo F.C.

North America
 United States:
 Carolina Dynamo
 Houston Dynamo
 Denver Dynamos (defunct)